The siege of Érsekújvár was fought between July 7 and August 17 of 1685, between the besieging Habsburg army and the Ottoman garrison of Érsekújvár, city in what is today Nové Zámky, Slovakia.
The Austrian commander, Aeneas de Caprara, invested the city and stormed it on August 17, slaying the entire Ottoman garrison.

References 

 

Battles of the Great Turkish War
Sieges involving the Ottoman Empire
Sieges involving the Holy Roman Empire
Conflicts in 1685
1685 in the Habsburg monarchy
1685 in the Ottoman Empire